Fatal Past is a 1993 Australian thriller film.

References

External links 

1993 films
1990s thriller films
Australian thriller films
1990s English-language films
1990s Australian films